Ardabilya may refer to:
 Ərdəbilə, Azerbaijan
 Ardabilya, Iran